Nicolas Macrozonaris (born August 22, 1980) is a Canadian Olympic track and field athlete who has won the 100 metre national title four times and once in the 200 metre.

Career 
He was inspired to run track and field after watching Donovan Bailey win the 100 metres at the 1996 Summer Olympics in Atlanta. After watching that race, it motivated him to take the sport seriously. A few years later, as a junior, he tied Ben Johnson's Canadian national record in the 50 metre sprint, running a time of 5.83.  The following year, after 4 years of intensive training, he qualified for the 2000 Sydney Olympics' 100 meter event at the age of 19. At the Olympics, he ran a time of 10.45 to finish 42nd overall out of 95, being eliminated in the heats.

His culminating moment as a sprinter came in 2003 when he ran a time of 10.03 and beat the then world record holder, American Tim Montgomery in Mexico City. As of 2019, his time of 10.03 is still ranked the sixth fastest Canadian 100m time, behind Bruny Surin and Donovan Bailey who both share the national record with a 9.84 clocking, along with Andre De Grasse (9.90), Aaron Brown (9.96) and Gavin Smellie (10.01).

In 2004, he qualified for the 2004 Summer Olympics in Athens and finished 28th out of 80 in the 100 meter event, thus improving his position from his previous Olympic Games in Sydney where he finished 42nd.

Nicolas has represented Canada in many international competitions and has qualified for six World Championships, three Francophone Games, two Olympic Games, two Commonwealth games, one World Cup, and one Pan American Championship.

In 2017, he ran for the Action Laval party in the 2017 Laval municipal election, but finished third in the Sainte-Dorothée District.

Statistics

Personal bests

References

External links
 
 
 
 
 

1980 births
Living people
Canadian male sprinters
Athletes (track and field) at the 2000 Summer Olympics
Athletes (track and field) at the 2004 Summer Olympics
Olympic track and field athletes of Canada
Athletes (track and field) at the 2002 Commonwealth Games
Commonwealth Games competitors for Canada
World Athletics Championships athletes for Canada
Canadian people of Greek descent
Sportspeople from Laval, Quebec
Anglophone Quebec people
Canadian sportsperson-politicians